Open is a manufacturer of performance mountain bicycle frames based in Basel. Founded by Andy Kessler and Gerard Vroomen in 2012, the company debuted with a single model, the O-1.0. It was claimed to be the lightest 29-inch production hard tail on the market.

Special editions

Open have sold frames with paint designs created in collaboration with various other companies.

References

External links
 Official OPEN website

Cycle manufacturers of Switzerland
Companies established in 2012
Manufacturing companies based in Basel